The 2017 Segunda División season, also known as Copa Best Cable Perú 2017 for sponsorship reasons, was the 72nd edition of the second tier of Federación Peruana de Futbol. The tournament will be played on a home-and-away round-robin basis. The tournament started on 22 April 2017 and it ended in November 2017. The fixtures were drawn on 6 April 2017.

Teams
A total of 15 teams played in the league, one less than the previous season, including 12 sides from the 2016 season, two relegated from the 2016 Torneo Descentralizado and one promoted from the 2016 Copa Perú.

Universidad César Vallejo returns to the Second Division after an eight-year spell in the top flight. In turn, Defensor La Bocana was relegated to the Segunda Division after a short spell of one year. Hualgayoc was promoted as the 2016 Copa Perú runner-up.

The teams which had been relegated from the Segunda División the previous season were Unión Tarapoto, who were relegated mid-season, and Atlético Torino. Alianza Universidad withdrew before the start of the season and was relegated to the Copa Perú. Kola San Martín, Deportivo Garcilaso, and León de Huánuco expressed interest in taking Alianza Universidad's slot in the tournament. Leon de Huanuco's appeal to the Court of Arbitration for Sport to return to the first division was denied and the Peruvian Football Federation relegated them to the 2017 Copa Perú's departmental stage. In the end, the Federation also decided to play the tournament with only 15 teams.

League table

Results

Title play-off
Because Sport Boys and Universidad César Vallejo finished the regular season with the same number of points, a title play-off match will be played on neutral ground to decide the champion and owner of the 2018 Torneo Descentralizado berth.

Top goalscorers
Players sorted first by goals scored, then by last name.

Source: ADFP-SD,  DeChalaca.com

See also
 2017 Torneo Descentralizado
 2017 Copa Perú

References

External links
  
Peruvian Segunda División news at Peru.com 
Peruvian Segunda División statistics and news at Dechalaca.com 
Peruvian Segunda División news at SegundaPerú.com 
 RSSSF

2017
2017 in Peruvian football